Bassarona iva, the grand duke, is a species of nymphalid butterfly found in the Himalayas.

Range
It is found in Sikkim, Bhutan, Assam, Manipur, and the southern Shan States of Myanmar.

Subspecies
Bassarona iva iva (Sikkim, Assam and possibly Bhutan)
Bassarona iva cooperi Tytler (southern Shan States)

References

Bassarona
Butterflies of Asia
Butterflies described in 1857
Taxa named by Frederic Moore